Vishal Mishra may refer to:

 Vishal Mishra (composer), Indian music composer and singer
 Vishal Mishra (director), Hindi film writer and director

See also
 Vishal Misra, Indian-American scientist